En Su Intimidad is the tenth (10th) studio album by Puerto Rican singer Yolandita Monge. It was released in 1978 on LP, 8-Track and Cassette format and was her last studio album under the now defunct label Coco Records. Two years later, she was signed by the international label CBS Records, now Sony Music.

The album is available as a digital download at iTunes and Amazon, as well as several hits songs also appear in various compilations of the singer available on such media platforms.  Coco Records/Charly re-released the album in November 2020 as a digital download, also available at iTunes and Amazon. The album was released on CD for the first time in June 2022.

Track listing

Credits and personnel
Vocals: Yolandita Monge
Producer: Enrique Méndez
Arrangements: Osvaldo Requena
Sound Engineering: Jorge Beren
Mastering: José Rodríguez
Photography: Joche Dávila
Album Design: Jorge Vargas

Notes
Track listing and credits from album cover.
Re-released digitally by Musical Productions on Nov 3, 2008.
Re-released digitally by Coco Records/Charly on December, 2020.
Re-released on CD by Coco Records in June 2022.

References

Yolandita Monge albums
1978 albums